The Safatba'al inscription or the Shipitbaal inscription is a Phoenician inscription (KAI 7, TSSI III 9) found in Byblos in 1936, published in 1945.

It is at the National Museum of Beirut.

Text of the inscription
The inscription reads:

{|
|+ 
|-
| (1) || QR Z BNY ŠPṬB‘L MLK || This wall was built by Safatbaal, king
|-
| (2) || GBL BN ’LB‘L MLK GBL || of Byblos, son of Elibaal, king of Byblos,
|-
| (3) || BYḤMLK MLK GBL LB‘LT || son of Yehimelk, king of Byblos, for Baalat
|-
| (4) || GBL ’DTW T’RK B‘LT GBL || Gebal, his Lady. May Baalat Gebal prolong
|-
| (5) || YMT ŠPṬB‘L WŠNTW ‘L GBL || the days of Safatbaal and his years over Byblos.
|}

Bibliography
 Christopher Rollston, "The Dating of the Early Royal Byblian Phoenician Inscriptions: A Response to Benjamin Sass."  MAARAV 15 (2008): 57–93.
 Benjamin Mazar, The Phoenician Inscriptions from Byblos and the Evolution of the Phoenician-Hebrew Alphabet, in The Early Biblical Period: Historical Studies (S. Ahituv and B. A. Levine, eds., Jerusalem: IES, 1986 [original publication: 1946]): 231–247.
 William F. Albright, The Phoenician Inscriptions of the Tenth Century B.C. from Byblus, JAOS 67 (1947): 153–154.

References

Phoenician inscriptions
Collections of the National Museum of Beirut
Archaeological artifacts
Phoenician steles